Pizzo Solögna is a mountain of the Lepontine Alps, overlooking the Val Bavona in the Swiss canton of Ticino. It is located south of the Basòdino.

References

External links
 Pizzo Solögna on Hikr

Mountains of the Alps
Mountains of Switzerland
Mountains of Ticino
Lepontine Alps